Valdés is a Spanish toponymic surname of Asturian origin. Its appearance has been dated back to the times of the Reconquista in the municipality of Valdés, Asturias, where the eponymous lineage began. The area around the current town of Luarca was known as Val de Ese, "valley of the river Ese", as attested in medieval documents. This river would later be known as the Esva River. According to Luis de Valdés' Memorias (1622), the river itself took its name from the letter s (ese in Spanish) due to its similar shape, although this is considered unlikely.

During medieval times the surname was taken by many families living in the area around Luarca, which make is difficult to establish demarcations between families of the time. By the 14th century, the surname had spread throughout the Kingdom of Castile, and later all of the Iberian peninsula. During the colonization of the Americas, the surname became established there, where many variations appeared, such as Valdez (by analogy with the Spanish patronymic -ez).

The French surname Valdès or Vaudès, from Peter Valdes, founder of the Waldensian religious movement, is unrelated to the Spanish surname. Instead, it derived from the Latin Valdesius, which referred to Vaulx-en-Velin, Lyon, his place of origin.

People with the surname Valdés
Aaron Valdes (born 1993), American basketball player
Al Valdes (born 1935), Canadian football player
Amadito Valdés (born 1946), Cuban timbalero
Antonio Valdés y Fernández Bazán (1744–1816), Spanish naval officer
Basilio J. Valdes (1892–1970), Filipino general officer
Bebo Valdés (1918–2013), Cuban pianist
Carlos "Patato" Valdés (1926–2007), Cuban conga player
Cayetano Valdés y Flores (1767–1834), Spanish naval officer and explorer
Chucho Valdés (born 1941), Cuban pianist
Fernando de Valdés y Llanos (1575–1639), Archbishop of Granada
Fernando de Valdés y Salas (1483–1568), Spanish churchman and jurist
Francisco Fellove Valdés (1923–2013), Cuban songwriter and singer
Gabriel Valdés (1919–2011), Chilean politician
Germán Valdés (1915–1973), Mexican actor, singer and comedian
Gonzalo Fernández de Oviedo y Valdés (1478–1557), Spanish historian
Hernán Valdés (born 1934), Chilean writer
Israel López Valdés (1918–2008), Cuban bassist and composer
Jerónimo Valdés (1785–1855), Spanish general and governor of Cuba
José Manuel Valdés (1767–1843), Peruvian physician and writer
Juan Gabriel Valdés (born 1947), Chilean political scientist
Juan de Valdés (1500–1541), Spanish religious writer
Juan de Valdés Leal (1622–1690), Spanish painter
Juan Meléndez Valdés (1754–1817), Spanish poet
José Ramón Guizado Valdés (1899–1964), President of Panama 1955
Lisandra Teresa Ordaz Valdés (born 1988), Cuban chess grandmaster
Lisván Valdés (born 1988), Cuban basketball player
Luchi Cruz-Valdes (born 1965), Filipina broadcast journalist
Merceditas Valdés (1922–1996), Cuban singer
Miguel Alemán Valdés (1902–1983), President of Mexico 1946–1952
Orestes López Valdés (1908–1991), Cuban musician and composer
 (1544–1615), Governor of Cuba 1600–1607
Pedro Valdés (born 1973), Mexican baseball player
Ramón Maximiliano Valdés, President of Panama 1916–1918
Ramón Valdés (1923–1988), Mexican actor
Roy Valdés (1920–2005), Cuban baseball player
Víctor Valdés (born 1982), Spanish football goalkeeper
Viengsay Valdés (born 1976), Cuban ballerina
Zoé Valdés (born 1959), Cuban writer

Fictional characters
Cecilia Valdés, Cuban novel and zarzuela character
Elpidio Valdés, Cuban comic character

People with the surname Valdez
Alyssa Valdez (born 1993), Filipina volleyball player
Basil Valdez, (born 1951), Filipino balladeer
César Valdez (born 1985), Dominican baseball player
Chayito Valdez (1945–2016), Mexican musician and entertainer
Cynthia Valdez (born 1987), Mexican rhythmic gymnast
Erik Valdez (born 1979), American actor
Fidel Valdez Ramos (1928–2022), President of the Philippines 1992–1998
Framber Valdez (born 1993), Dominican baseball pitcher
José Travassos Valdez (1787–1862), Portuguese soldier and statesman
Juan Valdez, colonial governor of Texas 1714–1716
Julio Valdez (born 1956), Dominican professional baseball player and manager
Kate Valdez (born 2000), Filipina actress
Nelson Haedo Valdez (born 1983), Paraguayan footballer
Patssi Valdez (born 1951), American Chicana artist and founding member of the Asco art collective
Phillips Valdéz (born 1991), Dominican baseball player
Rodrigo Valdez (1946–2017), Colombian boxer
Wendy Valdez (born 1982), Filipina beauty queen, former reality star, and actress
Wilmar Valdez (born 1965), Uruguayan football executive

Fictional characters
Juan Valdez, a character appearing in advertisements for Colombian coffee
Leo Valdez, a character appearing in novels by Rick Riordan

References

Surnames of Spanish origin